CDK Global Inc. is an American multinational corporation based in Hoffman Estates, Illinois, providing data and technology to the automotive, heavy truck, recreation, and heavy equipment industries.

The company has 37 locations in 25 countries and its products are sold in over 100 countries, however most of its customers are in the United States. In 2020, the company ranked 911 on the Fortune 1000 list of the largest United States corporations by total revenue.

Products
CDK Global provides integrated information technology and digital marketing to the automotive, heavy truck, recreation, and heavy equipment industries. The company's products help to integrate clients buying processes and include targeted advertising and marketing, as well as products for the sale, financing, insuring, parts supply, repair, and maintenance of vehicles. Competitors include Reynolds and Reynolds and Dealertrack.

History
The company has its origins as the Dealer Services division of Automatic Data Processing (ADP) which was formed in 1973 after ADP's acquisition of National Inventory Control System, Portland OR (NICS) and Computer System Inc., Cincinnati, OH (CSI) providing computerized  Accounting, Financial Reporting, Sales Analysis,  Lease Accounting, Parts Inventory Control, Customer Relations, Management Systems for both Sales and Service, and Payroll Services for automotive dealerships. As ADP Dealer Services, the division was subsequently built up of more than 30 acquisitions completed over the next 41 years.

On October 1, 2014, ADP Dealer Services division was spun-off to form the independent company CDK Global. The CDK in the company's name was inspired from different acquisitions; C from Cobalt Digital Marketing, D from the original ADP Dealer Services business and Kerridge Computer Company, a UK-based DMS supplier acquired by ADP in 2005, from which the 'K' stems.

Notable acquisitions include BZ Results (Automotive Dealer Services), winner of the 2006 “Innovative Company of the Year”, by ADP in 2006.

In 2020, CDK Global announced the sale of its international operations (to be called Keyloop) to Francisco Partners, as an effort to focus more on its North American business.

On April 7, 2022, CDK Global agreed to be acquired by Brookfield Business Partners and institutional partners for a total enterprise value of $8.3 billion. The deal will offer CDK investors $54.87 for each share held, representing a 30% premium.  Brookfield completed the deal on July 6, 2022.

References

External links
 

Software companies of the United States
Companies based in Cook County, Illinois
Hoffman Estates, Illinois
American companies established in 2014
Software companies established in 2014
Companies formerly listed on the Nasdaq
Corporate spin-offs
2022 mergers and acquisitions
American subsidiaries of foreign companies
Private equity portfolio companies